Təklə (also, Taklya and Teklya) is a village and municipality in the Masally Rayon of Azerbaijan.  It has a population of 1,623.

References 

Populated places in Masally District